Interlude is a 1968 British drama film directed by Kevin Billington and starring Oskar Werner, Barbara Ferris and Virginia Maskell.

The film is a loose remake of the 1957 American film Interlude directed by Douglas Sirk. It was Maskell's final film as she died in January 1968, five months before its release.

Plot
A famous male conductor gives an interview to an attractive young female reporter. He speaks a bit too frankly and ends up being given an unwanted sabbatical from conducting. He begins an affair with the young reporter during his interlude, and the accumulation of differences in their ages and background begins to mount.

Cast

 Oskar Werner as Stefan Zelter
 Barbara Ferris as Sally
 Virginia Maskell as Antonia
 Donald Sutherland as Lawrence
 Nora Swinburne as Mary
 Alan Webb as Andrew
 Bernard Kay as George Selworth
 Geraldine Sherman as Natalie Selworth
 John Cleese as PR Man
 Humphrey Burton as TV Director 
 Gino Melvazzi as Mario
 Muguette De Braie as Mario's Wife
 Robert Lang as Humphrey Turnbull
 Roslyn De Winter as Humphrey's Secretary
 Janet Davies as Nanny
 Sarah Jane Stratton as Sarah Jane
 Simon Davis as Simon 
 Steve Plytas as Frederico
 Roselie Westwater as Hotel Receptionist 
 Gay Cameron as Andrew's Girl Friend
 Anjula Harman as Lawrence's Pupil
 Ernest Fleishmann as Orchestra Manager
 Derek Jacobi as Paul
 Richard Pescud as Ernest

Production
The film was shot at Shepperton Studios and on location around London at various places including the Royal Albert Hall in Kensington, Fountain Court in Temple, Chelsea, and the Royal Festival Hall. The Zelter family home was shot at Binfield Manor in Berkshire, and Bodiam Castle and The Mermaid Inn, Rye in East Sussex were used for filming. The film's sets were designed by art director Tony Woollard.

Singer Timi Yuro performed the title song "Interlude". Another version by Yuro was released commercially. The song was covered in 1994 as duet by Morrissey and Siouxsie Sioux.

See also
 List of British films of 1968
 Interlude (1957)

References

Bibliography
 Robert Murphy. Sixties British Cinema. BFI, 1992.
 Tom Ryan. The Films of Douglas Sirk: Exquisite Ironies and Magnificent Obsessions. University Press of Mississippi, 2019.

External links
 

1968 films
1968 directorial debut films
1968 romantic drama films
Adultery in films
British remakes of American films
British romantic drama films
Columbia Pictures films
1960s English-language films
Films about classical music and musicians
Films about journalists
Films based on works by James M. Cain
Films directed by Kevin Billington
Films scored by Georges Delerue
Films shot in England
Films shot in London
Films shot in East Sussex
Films shot at Shepperton Studios
Films set in London
Films set in East Sussex
Films with screenplays by Hugh Leonard
1960s British films